Alex Vlasic (born June 5, 2001) is an American professional ice hockey defenseman currently playing for the Rockford IceHogs in the American Hockey League (AHL) as a prospect to the Chicago Blackhawks of the National Hockey League (NHL). He was selected by the Blackhawks in the second-round, 43rd overall, in the 2019 NHL Entry Draft.

Early life
Vlasic was born on June 5, 2001, in Wilmette, Illinois to parents Tara and John, and grew up alongside his older siblings Emma and Eric. He is of Yugoslavian descent; his grandfather immigrated to Montreal. Despite growing up in Illinois, Vlasic was a fan of the San Jose Sharks due to his cousin Marc-Édouard Vlasic's affiliation with them. Vlasic began skating at the age of three and played organized hockey with the Wilmette Braves at the Mite, Squirt and Pee Wee levels. His older siblings were also involved in the sport, as Emma played at Yale University and with the Connecticut Whale while his brother participated in the Chicago Blackhawks Special Hockey program. He played in the position of forward until he was nine years old when he switched to defence.

Playing career
Growing up in Illinois, Vlasic played for the Chicago Young Americans and Chicago Mission. While playing with the Chicago Mission Midget U16 team, Vlasic committed to play NCAA collegiate ice hockey the Boston University Terriers. At the time of the commitment, Vlasic was also considered a top five draft pick for the Ontario Hockey League (OHL). Instead of joining the OHL, Vlasic was recruited to play for the USA Hockey National Team Development Program (NTDP) for the 2017–18 USHL season. Vlasic later credied the NTDP's intense and fast-paced practices with improving his game, along with the assistance of the Under-17 coaching staff including John Wroblewski and Greg Moore. He also praised the addition of Dan Hinote as an associate head coach for furthering his development and muscle growth.

Collegiate
Vlasic played three seasons with the Boston Terriers while enrolled in the Boston University College of Arts and Sciences. Prior to his first year with the Terriers, Vlasic was drafted in the second-round, 43rd overall, by the Chicago Blackhawks the 2019 NHL Entry Draft. Following the draft, Vlasic reaffirmed his commitment to play collegiate ice hockey with the Terriers. He subsequently joined the Terriers for the 2019–20 season where he played in 34 games and recorded four assists. His first collegiate assist came on October 18 in 4–4 tie with the Northern Michigan Wildcats men's ice hockey team. When the collegiate season was cut short due to the COVID-19 pandemic, Vlasic and his sister created a makeshift weight room in the basement of their home and skated at a local ice rink. He also worked on his skills development with Tristan Musser, who was then with the Chicago Steel, and with Brian Keane who owns Prodigy Hockey.

Once the 2020–21 season began, Vlasic stated he felt his confidence soar as he was able to "figure how to use my size as an advantage and protect the puck much better." On February 5, 2021, Vlasic recorded his first collegiate ice hockey goal to lead the Terriers to an overtime loss against Boston College. By March, he had tallied three goals and eight points through 15 games. This includes his first career multi-point game in a 5–1 win over Maine on January 23.

The following season, Vlasic became one of the best defensive defensemen in the conference and was praised by his head coach for being an "elite skater for his size." He led the team with 50 blocked shots and has also tallied one goal and a career-high seven assists for eight points. As a result of his improved play, Vlasic earned Hockey East All-Star honors.

Professional
Vlasic signed an entry-level contract with the Chicago Blackhawks on March 15, 2022, after playing three years in the NCAA with the Boston University Terriers. He played in his first NHL game on March 19, 2022.

Career statistics

Regular season and playoffs

International

References

External links

Living people
2001 births
American men's ice hockey defensemen
Boston University Terriers men's ice hockey players
Chicago Blackhawks draft picks
Chicago Blackhawks players
USA Hockey National Team Development Program players